The Sha Tin District Council is the district council for the Sha Tin District in Hong Kong. It is one of 18 such councils. The Sha Tin District Council currently consists of 42 members, of which the district is divided into 41 constituencies, electing a total of 41 with 1 ex officio member who is the Sha Tin rural committee chairman. The latest election was held on 24 November 2019.

History
The Sha Tin District Council was established on 1 April 1981 under the name of the Sha Tin District Board as the result of the colonial Governor Murray MacLehose's District Administration Scheme reform. The District Board was partly elected with the ex-officio Regional Council members and Sha Tin Rural Committee chairman, as well as members appointed by the Governor until 1994 when last Governor Chris Patten refrained from appointing any member.

The Sha Tin District Board became Sha Tin Provisional District Board after the Hong Kong Special Administrative Region (HKSAR) was established in 1997 with the appointment system being reintroduced by Chief Executive Tung Chee-hwa. The current Sha Tin District Council was established on 1 January 2000 after the first District Council election in 1999. The appointed seats were abolished in 2015 after the modified constitutional reform proposal was passed by the Legislative Council in 2010.

As a new town in the 1980s, Sha Tin was a strategic target for emerging pro-democracy activists, when the three major pro-democracy political groups Hong Kong Affairs Society (HKAS), Hong Kong Association for Democracy and People's Livelihood (ADPL) and Meeting Point formed a strategic alliance in the 1988 District Board election, which saw prominent politicians Fung Chi-wood, Lau Kong-wah and Choy Kan-pui launched their political careers. Lau and Choy later quit the pro-democracy United Democrats of Hong Kong (UDHK) after the 1991 Legislative Council direct election and formed a new district-based political group Civil Force in which all its candidates were elected in the 1994 election and have been dominating the council since.

The 2000s saw the intense competitions between the Democratic Alliance for the Betterment of Hong Kong (DAB) and the Democratic Party, which saw the DAB dropped its seat from 1999 election's nine to 2003 election's two due to the anti-government sentiments following the historic 2003 July 1 protest, many of those in Ma On Shan fallen into the Democrats' hand with the defeats of Lau Kong-wah and Chan Hak-kan in Kam To and Chung On. The DAB rebounded from its defeat in the 2007 election, retaking most of its seats from the Democrats.

In 2014, Regina Ip's New People's Party (NPP) expanded its network to Sha Tin by absorbing the Civil Force, making NPP the largest party in the district. In the 2015 District Council election, the first election after the Umbrella Revolution, the pan-democrats made a surprising advance in the district, doubling their seats from 8 to 19 seats by defeating a number of veteran Civil Force councillors. The DAB also suffered some unexpected defeats in Ma On Shan, with incumbent Legislative Councillor Elizabeth Quat lost her seat to Labour Party new face Yip Wing in Chung On. However, The pro-Beijing camp was able to retain control of the council with a one-seat majority of the ex-officio seat occupied by the Sha Tin Rural Committee chairman.

In the historic landslide victory in 2019, the pro-democrats took control of the council by sweeping 40 of the 41 elected seats. Only the new constituency Di Yee was won by pro-Beijing DAB as two pro-democrat candidates split the votes which gave the DAB the victory.

Political control
Since 1982 political control of the council has been held by the following parties:

Political makeup

Elections are held every four years. 
As of October 19, 2020:

District result maps

Members represented
Starting from 1 January 2020:

Leadership

Chairs
Since 1985, the chairman is elected by all the members of the board:

Vice Chairs

Notes

References

 
Districts of Hong Kong
Sha Tin District